Unexpected may refer to:

Film and television 
Unexpected (2005 film), an Italian documentary directed by Domenico Distilo
Unexpected (2015 film), an American film directed by Kris Swanberg
The Unexpected (TV series), a 1950s TV anthology series
"Unexpected" (Heroes), a television episode
"Unexpected" (Star Trek: Enterprise), a television episode

Literature 
The Unexpected (1968 comic book), a 1968–1982 DC Comics horror-fantasy series, a continuation of Tales of the Unexpected
The Unexpected (2018 comic book), a 2018–2019 DC Comics superhero series
The Unexpected (novel), a 2000 Animorphs novel by K.A. Applegate

Music 
Unexpected (Angie Stone album) or the title song, 2008
Unexpected (Levina album), 2017
Unexpected (Lumidee album), 2007
Unexpected (Michelle Williams album) or the title song, 2008
Unexpected (Sandy Mölling album) or the title song (see below), 2004
Unexpected, an album by Jason Crabb, 2018
Unexpected, an album by Marla Glen, 2020
The Unexpected (album), by Beautiful Sin, 2006
"Unexpected" (song), by Sandy, 2004

See also 
Anticipation (disambiguation)
Unintended consequences, also unanticipated or unforeseen consequences, unexpected benefits and unexpected drawbacks